is a 2003 animated musical science fiction film. The film serves as a visual companion to Discovery, the second studio album by Daft Punk. Interstella 5555 tells the story of the abduction and rescue of an interstellar pop band. The film was produced by Toei Animation, directed by Kazuhisa Takenouchi and supervised by Leiji Matsumoto. The film's audio has no dialogue, but instead consists of the album Discovery and minimal sound effects.

Plot

The main points of the story coincide with the Daft Punk tracks on their Discovery album. On a humanoid-alien planet, a band is playing to a packed audience; keyboardist Octave, guitarist Arpegius, drummer Baryl, and bass player Stella ("One More Time"). A military force from Earth invades the planet and kidnaps the band ("Aerodynamic").

A space pilot called Shep is seen working outside his guitar-shaped ship, then goes inside. He is interrupted from his daydream about Stella by a distress call about the kidnapping, and pursues the kidnappers through a wormhole, where he crash lands on Earth ("Digital Love").

The band is taken to an underground facility, where their memories are removed to disks and their blue skin changed to make them resemble humans. They are fitted with mind-control devices hidden inside sunglasses ("Harder, Better, Faster, Stronger").
Their captor, Earl de Darkwood, poses as their manager and presents them as a new band called The Crescendolls, who take the world by storm ("Crescendolls").
The fame has its disadvantages as the exhausted members of the band are forced to sign large amounts of marketing material. Meanwhile, Shep finds his way to the city and discovers what has happened to the band ("Nightvision").

During a stadium concert, Shep flies in with a jet pack and fires a beam at each band member, freeing all of them from the mind control except for Stella. In the escape, Shep is mortally wounded, and Darkwood's bodyguards are revealed to be androids ("Superheroes").

Still under Darkwood's control, Stella finds a card with the address of Darkwood's home, Darkwood Manor, which she hides in her dress. She is taken to a "Gold Record Award" ceremony, where the Crescendolls win the Gold Record. Baryl is concealed in the audience and frees Stella with the beam, and they make their escape with Octave's help ("High Life").
The band returns to Shep, who reveals their true identities before he dies ("Something About Us").
They bury Shep and his spirit rises into space. While driving away, they use the card Stella took earlier to find their way to Darkwood Manor, and decide to investigate ("Voyager").

While exploring Darkwood's mansion, the band finds their way into a secret room, in which they find a journal revealing Darkwood's plans. He has been kidnapping alien musicians from various worlds and passing disguising them as humans to acquire 5,555 gold records, with which he can rule the universe. Darkwood captures them and attempts to sacrifice Stella to complete the ritual, but Arpegius manages to throw the final gold record into a chasm, and Darkwood follows it into the abyss, which is revealed to be filled with lava, apparently killing him. His foot soldiers follow after him, killing them as well ("Veridis Quo").
The band travels back to the record company to retrieve the memory disks. Octave sneaks in to steal them, but while escaping from the building, he is tased by a guard, and his skin reverts to its blue state ("Short Circuit").

The authorities find Shep's ship and mount an operation to return the Crescendolls to normal, and get the quartet back to their home planet ("Face to Face").
As they enter the wormhole, Darkwood's spirit appears and attacks the ship. Shep's spirit also appears and fights Darkwood, which frees them. The band returns to their home planet to great acclaim, and a statue of Shep is erected ("Too Long"). At the end, it is implied that the whole story was the dream of a young boy, inspired by the Discovery album and toys in his room.

Characters
 Stella – The only female band member, she is the bassist of the Crescendolls, as well as the main protagonist of the film.
 Arpegius – The guitarist of the Crescendolls.
 Baryl – The drummer of the Crescendolls. He is noticeably shorter in stature than most of the other characters. 
 Octave – The keyboardist and vocalist of the Crescendolls.
 Shep – An alien astronaut on a mission to rescue the captured Crescendolls. He has a crush on Stella.
 Earl de Darkwood – The human captor of the Crescendolls and the main antagonist of the film.
 Record Co. Owner – The supposed owner of the Record Company. He is giddy and excited in most of his on-screen time.  
 Daft Punk – The masked musicians themselves make a cameo appearance in "High Life".

Production
The idea of making a feature film to visualize Discovery came about during the album's early recording sessions. Daft Punk's concept for the story involved the merging of science fiction with entertainment industry culture. The duo had initially conceived of a live-action film featuring themes of overcoming oppression and rebelling against the machinery of life. After the live-action approach was discarded, several styles of animation were considered before settling on that of Daft Punk's childhood hero, Leiji Matsumoto.

The film concept was further developed with Daft Punk collaborator Cédric Hervet, with Bangalter and Hervet writing the script. A team consisting of Daft Punk, Hervet, Pedro Winter and Gildas Loaec were introduced to Toei Animation through a connection at Toshiba EMI. The script was brought to Tokyo in July 2000 in the hope of creating the film with Matsumoto, who remarked that he in turn was inspired by French filmmakers. After Matsumoto joined the team as visual supervisor, Shinji Shimizu had been contacted to produce the animation and Kazuhisa Takenouchi to direct the film. With the translation coordination of Tamiyuki "Spike" Sugiyama, production began in October 2000 and ended in April 2003. Daft Punk commuted to Tokyo on a near-monthly basis as Toei produced the storyboards. The cost of the film is said to have been $4 million.

The first four episodes from the film were released to serve as promotional videos throughout the Discovery campaign, and were shown on Cartoon Network on 31 August 2001 during the "Toonami Midnight Run: Special Edition". Cartoon Network later hosted the episodes online as part of their short-lived Toonami Reactor project (later revived as Toonami Jetstream). In December 2003, Interstella 5555 was released along with the album Daft Club, which served to promote the film and provided previously unreleased remixes of tracks from the Discovery album. A Blu-ray edition of the film was released in September 2011 and contains similar artwork packaging.

Many elements common to Matsumoto's stories, such as romanticism of noble sacrifice and remembrance of fallen friends, appear in Interstella 5555. Daft Punk revealed in an interview that Captain Harlock was a great influence on them in their childhood. They also stated, "The music we have been making must have been influenced at some point by the shows we were watching when we were little kids."

Track listing

Reception
The film was well received by critics. Rotten Tomatoes gives the film a rating of 86% based on 7 reviews (6 positive, 1 negative).

The BBC gave the film four stars out of five, saying that the film is a "visual and aural treat of intergalactic proportions". MovieMartyr.com said that the film was "the best animated film made in 2003, and a true testament to the artistry possible in two very different mediums." Mania.com concluded by stating that the film is "a unique feature that shows just how well music can be blended to animation to make a compelling story."

Empire said the film was "Fine if you like the band – you'll be treated to some cartoons playing over the top of their Discovery album. For everyone else, just daft."

Notes

References

External links
 – archived from the original  on 2 August 2003 
 
 

2003 anime films
2003 films
2000s fantasy adventure films
2000s English-language films
2000s French animated films
2000s musical fantasy films
Adventure anime and manga
Animated musical films
Animated musical groups
Animated science fantasy films
Animated space adventure films
Anime-influenced Western animation
Daft Punk
Daft Punk video albums
Visual albums
Electronic music films
Fantasy anime and manga
Fantasy music
Films about wormholes
Films based on albums
Films directed by Daisuke Nishio
Films set on fictional planets
French adult animated films
French animated fantasy films
French animated science fiction films
French fantasy adventure films
French musical films
Japanese animated fantasy films
Japanese animated science fiction films
Japanese fantasy adventure films
Japanese musical films
Music in anime and manga
Science fiction anime and manga
Science fiction musical films
Sung-through musical films
Toei Animation films
2003 science fiction films